Vladyslav Hrinchenko (born on 22 September 1989, in Ukraine) is a Ukrainian football player.

Club history
He currently plays for the club FC Kremin Kremenchuk. He used to play for PFC Sevastopol.

References

External links
Official team website for FC Kremin Kremenchuk
Official team website for PFC Sevastopol
FC Kremin Kremenchuk Squad

Living people
FC Sevastopol players
FC Kremin Kremenchuk players
Ukrainian footballers
1989 births
Association football midfielders